Yang Chaoyue (born July 31, 1998) is a Chinese actress and singer. After finishing third in Tencent's girl group survival show Produce 101, she debuted as a member of Rocket Girls 101. She was named by China Newsweek as one of the most influential Chinese people in 2018.

Early life
Yang was born on July 31, 1998, in a village in Dafeng, Yancheng, Jiangsu, China. Her parents divorced when she was twelve. Instead of going to high school, she decided to help support her family and left home to work. She had various job experiences such as waitress, garment worker, flyer distributor, prior to becoming an idol.

Career

2016–2017: Girl group contest and CH2
In 2016, the eSports game Battle of Balls hosted a girl group contest offering a 2000 RMB salary with accommodation and meals.
Yang was voted to be the most popular contestant during the contest and began her idol trainee career along with ten other contestants.
In 2017, eight of the trainees formed the girl group CH2.
Due to Wenlan Culture's video game industry background and the lack of a dedicated performance theater, Chaoyue did not receive proper training; instead, her jobs were mostly involved in promoting video games at various events.

2018–present: Produce 101, Rocket Girls 101 and acting debut

In April, Yang Chaoyue and three of her CH2 teammates were chosen to represent Wenlan Culture on reality girl group survival show Produce 101 aired from April 21 to June 23, 2018, on Tencent Video. She ranked third with over 139 million votes and debuted as a member of Rocket Girls 101 on June 23. In September she released her first solo song, a promotional single, titled Follow Me. In November, Yang was announced to make her acting debut in the historical drama The Promise of Chang'an.

In March 2019, she appeared in the 2019 FIBA Basketball World Cup draw ceremony as a special guest and the World Cup draw ambassador to assist the draw. The same year she played her first leading role in the youth sports drama Project 17: Side by Side. Yang was later ranked 58th in the Forbes China Celebrity 100 list for 2019. Forbes China listed Yang under their 30 Under 30 Asia 2019 list which consisted of 30 influential people under 30 years old who have had a substantial effect in their fields.

In 2020, Yang starred in the fantasy historical web series Ever Night playing Hao Tian/Tian Nu. She then played lead roles in xianxia romance drama Dance of the Phoenix, and romantic comedy-drama Midsummer Is Full of Love. She ranked 80th on Forbes China Celebrity 100 list.

Controversy
Despite her poor performance during the evaluation stage in Produce 101, Show Lo commented that Yang Chaoyue has a feel which will naturally appeal to viewers. Tao wanted to give her a spot in A class; however, following Ella Chen's suggestion, Chaoyue ended up being assigned into C class. When the first episode was aired, Chaoyue soon gained a huge popularity and was voted into A class. This resulted in debate and put her on multiple Weibo trending topics. Finally, hateful comments emerged all around Weibo, degrading her stage performances and her personality, and turned into a widespread case of cyberbullying. After finishing third in the final episode, Chaoyue was once again the most-searched topic on Weibo and was a trending keyword on Baidu, China's largest search engine.

Some netizens anonymously reported Chaoyue to the Ministry of Culture, claiming that she did not have any singing or dancing talent and that allowing her to debut in Rocket Girls 101, "violates the Core Socialist Values". Wang Sicong, son of tycoon Wang Jianlin, also criticised Chaoyue and made her a trending topic on Weibo once again.

Discography

Singles

Filmography

Television series

Television show

Awards and nominations

Magazine Covers

Notes

References

External links

 
 
 

1998 births
Living people
21st-century Chinese actresses
Actresses from Jiangsu
Chinese television actresses
Produce 101 (Chinese TV series) contestants
Rocket Girls 101 members
Singers from Jiangsu
People from Yancheng
Chinese idols